Stephen J. Carter, AIA, NCARB, LF'82 (born 1945 in Cincinnati, Ohio) is an American architect.

Biography
Carter was born in Cincinnati, Ohio.  He received degrees from the University of Cincinnati College of Design, Architecture, Art, and Planning and Harvard Graduate School of Design, where he was Loeb Fellow in 1981 and 1982. As a student Carter won a design competition held in 1968 for the memorial to Henry Hobson Richardson's Greater Cincinnati Chamber of Commerce building.  The memorial was completed in 1972 and resides in Burnet Woods.

Carter taught and/or lectured in the Architectural programs at Ohio State University, The University of Cincinnati, Harvard University and Miami University of Ohio where he was a Graduate Design Studio Head for 19 years. His teaching experience accrued while he practiced full-time at Lorenz and Williams Incorporated (LWI) in Dayton, Ohio. Carter became an LWI partner in 1982 and CEO/Chairman of the Board from 1999 to 2005. He is now a Partner Emeritus.
 
Carter has worked on projects as the LWI team member in association with other notable architects including; Charles Willard Moore, Michael Graves, Peter Eisenman, Thom Mayne and James Ingo Freed.  These associations provided an opportunity to participate in a wide variety of philosophical design approaches enriching his practice and teaching.

Carter has designed project types including; Corporate Headquarters, Restoration & Adaptive reuse, libraries, medical centers, public spaces and civic centers, cultural facilities, education, K-12 and universities.

Some of his most notable designs include; The National Aviation Hall of Fame, NCR Corporation World Headquarters (Dayton, Ohio) master plan, MetLife Midwestern Headquarters, Ohio State University Main Library, Eli Lilly and Company HQ Historic Restoration, Xavier University Graduate Student Housing, SCC Center for Integrated Learning, SunWatch Indian Village Interpretive Center, Carillon Historical Park and River Design Dayton. His latest project is Schuster Heart Hospital for Kettering Medical Center.

Carter won the Progressive Architecture Award twice (1975, 1977), the American Institute of Architects Ohio Honor Award twelve times, the American Institute of Architects Dayton Honor Award ten times, Operation Resurrection a monument to Henry Hobson Richardson and numerous other awards and honors.  His work has been featured in articles in French, German, Japanese and American magazines and periodicals including; Progressive Architecture, Architectural Record, Urban Design, JA, Baumeister, Architecture Intérieure Créé and Rizzoli International Publications.

Carter has served in the various officer positions of American Institute of Architects.  He was President of the Dayton Chapter of the AIA in 1982, served on the AIA Ohio Board and was in charge of the AIA Honor Awards Program at the State Convention in Cleveland, Ohio.  He was most recently the Lowcountry Director of the South Carolina chapter of the American Institute of Architects.  He resides and practices on Hilton Head Island, SC. His practice is focused on design/master planning consultation on a wide variety of project types.

Selected projects

The following are projects in which Carter's main role was designer/principal in charge.

CORPORATE HEADQUARTERS
 Metropolitan Life Midwestern Head Office, Miamisburg, Ohio 1977
 NCR Corporation World Headquarters Planning and Programming, Dayton, Ohio 1977
 NCR Corporation Regional Office, Cleveland, Ohio 1982
 L. M. Berry (Yellow Pages) South Central Area Headquarters, Birmingham, Alabama 1984
 The Children's Place Headquarters & National Distribution Center, Montville Township, New Jersey 1986

RESTORATION & ADAPTIVE REUSE
 Old Post Office, Restoration for Lorenz & Williams Incorporated Office, Dayton, Ohio 1979
 Arcade Square (Dayton Arcade), Retail Center, Dayton, Ohio 1980
 Chemineer Incorporated, Corporate Headquarters, Kuhns Building Renovation, Dayton, Ohio 1981
 Eli Lilly & Company, Remodeling Building 13/21, Indianapolis, Indiana 1987

LIBRARIES
 Ohio State University William Oxley Thompson Library, Columbus, Ohio 1977
 Middletown Public Library, Middletown, Ohio 1981
 United Theological Seminary Learning Resource Center Design, Library/Faculty Office Building, Dayton, Ohio 1985
 Clark County Public Library, Springfield, Ohio 1989

MEDICAL

 St. Elizabeth Medical Center, Dayton, Ohio, 1974
 Sycamore Medical Center, Miamisburg, Ohio, Master Plan, Programming, 1975
 Dayton Children's Medical Center, Dayton, Ohio, Master Plan, Phases I & II, 1977

PUBLIC PLACES
 River Corridor Plan, Dayton, Ohio, Miami Conservancy District, 1977
 Montgomery County Courthouse Square, Dayton, Ohio 1978
 River's Edge Park, Dayton, Ohio, Miami Conservancy District, 1980
 Carillon Historical Park Master Plan, Dayton, Ohio: Wright Hall Addition, Dicke Transportation Center, Kettering Education Center, Culp Cafe

RETAIL
 Federated Department Stores, Columbus, Ohio, Lafayette Square, Lafayette, Indiana; New Division of Department Stores, Chicago, Illinois 1970-1974
 Rouse Company, Dayton, Ohio: Multiple Retail Projects. 1983
 The Home Company, Chicago, Illinois: Furniture Store, 1985

CULTURAL FACILITIES
 Dayton Natural History Museum, SunWatch Indian Village Interpretive Center, Miamisburg, Ohio 1987
 The National Aviation Hall of Fame Design, Fairborn, Ohio 1989

HIGHER EDUCATION
 Village Housing at Xavier University, Cincinnati, Ohio 1989
 Sinclair Community College Center for Interactive Learning, Dayton, Ohio, 1998
 Sinclair Community College Food Court, Dayton, Ohio 2000
 Ohio Northern University College of Business Administration, Ada, Ohio, 2003

OTHER
 NCR Worldwide Service Parts Distribution Center, Peachtree City, Georgia, 1972
 U.S. Postal Service: Trotwood Branch; West Carrollton Branches, 1974
 NCR Corporation World Parts Distribution Center, Atlanta, Georgia 1974
 Dayton Children's Medical Center Master Plan & Phase I, Dayton, Ohio 1975-1978
 Institute of Advanced Manufacturing Sciences, Cincinnati, Ohio 1986
 Mainstreet Division of Federated Department Stores, 22 Stores of 2 Prototype Designs, Chicago, Illinois; Detroit, Michigan; Minneapolis, Minnesota 1984-1988

References

External links
Riverdesign Dayton, A Planning History

1945 births
20th-century American architects
Fellows of the American Institute of Architects
Architects from Cincinnati
Modernist architects from the United States
Organic architecture
Living people
21st-century American architects